The Come Back, All is Forgiven Tour: Live is a live concert video by the British rock band Steve Harley & Cockney Rebel, which was filmed during their 1989 tour. The concert video has also been released in a variety of guises as a live album.

Background
Steve Harley & Cockney Rebel's 1989 "The Come Back, All is Forgiven" tour was the band's first since their 1981 Christmas tour, and their first concert since a one-off show in London in 1984. Harley made the decision to go back out on the road with a new line-up of Cockney Rebel in 1988 and a UK tour took place in February and March 1989. In addition, Harley made future plans to release new material by returning to the studio during the previous month. With guitarist Jim Cregan, keyboardist Duncan Mackay and drummer Stuart Elliott, six tracks were recorded, including "When I'm with You", which Harley hoped would help the band gain a record deal. Speaking of the tour's name, Harley told the Newcastle Journal in 1989, "That's me being ironic. It stops anyone in your profession calling it a comeback tour or anything derogatory like that."

Following the UK tour, the band returned with a larger 64-date tour under the same name, which covered both the UK and Europe. Two of the concerts on the tour, at the Dome Theatre in Brighton (17 June) and the Derngate Theatre in Northampton (28 June), were professionally filmed to produce a concert video. The Come Back, All is Forgiven Tour: Live was released by Odyssey on VHS in October 1989. Featuring fourteen songs of Harley's own personal choice from the two concerts, it was directed by Steve Hills, produced by Vance Goodwin, and produced by G & H Production Partnership in association with Steve Mather for JSE and Adrian Munsey for Odyssey Video. The tour was deemed a success, and the band, under different line-up changes, have continued to tour since.

On the back cover of the VHS, Harley was quoted: "So, how long has it been? Six, perhaps seven years since the last British tour? It's been far too long, of that I am certain. And there's no good reason for it, really. You know how much I love it up there. Quite honestly, there is nowhere I'd rather be. When you sing with me the choruses (often the entire lyrics!) of "Make Me Smile", the smile is genuine. The thanks are from deep inside; the joy is unequalled. To you, without whom... thanks."

Release
The Come Back, All is Forgiven Tour: Live was originally released on VHS on 13 October 1989 by Odyssey. On 20 February 2012, Odyssey gave the video its first DVD release, released under the title Steve Harley + Cockney Rebel - Live.

CD version
The audio of the video has been released as a CD album under many guises across Europe and beyond. These albums have been released by a number of different 'super-cheapo' labels. The majority of versions of the album omitted the opening track "Dancing on the Telephone", while others placed "Make Me Smile (Come Up and See Me)" as the first track.

Track listing

Critical reception

In an AllMusic review of the 1994 Make Me Smile - Live on Tour release of the concert, Dave Thompson stated: "The highlights are the two cuts from Harley's Yes You Can album, "The Lighthouse" and "Star for a Week," [which] work far more effectively live than they did in the studio. But the retreads of the older material offer only isolated sparks of interest and innovation - ten minutes of "Sebastian" impress with their portentousness, and the medley of "The Best Years of Our Lives"/"Sweet Dreams" is perverse enough to demand a second listen. The problem is, this is meant to be a Steve Harley album. The audience often sings louder than he does."

Personnel

Cockney Rebel
 Steve Harley - lead vocals, guitar
 Rick Driscoll - lead guitar, backing vocals
 Barry Wickens - electric violin, guitar, backing vocals
 Ian Nice - keyboards
 Kevin Powell - bass guitar, backing vocals
 Stuart Elliott - drums

Concert crew
 Roy Wood - sound engineer
 Mick Gibbs - sound recording
 Steve Harley - sound mix
 Steve Hills - sound mix
 Scott Thompson - monitor engineer
 Dave Thomas - backline technician
 Clive Davies - lighting designer
 Leanne Bogen - graphics

Video production team
 Steve Harley - track selection, sound mix supervision, digital remix supervision
 Steve Hills - director
 Vance Goodwin - producer
 G & H Production Partnership - producer
 Steve Mather for JSE - production associate
 Adrian Munsey for Odyssey Video - production associate
 Stuart Shepherd - VT editor
 Odyssey Video - studio
 Virgin Distribution for Odyssey Video - distributor
 Shoot That Tiger! - design
 Linda Chapman - cover photo
 Steve Mather, JSE (London) - representation
 Skycom TV - facilities

References

Live video albums
1989 video albums